Acantholycosa oligerae is a species of wolf spider only known from Primorsky Krai, Russia.

This spider, up to 10 mm in length, is brown with a pale stripe down the middle of the carapace. In males the stripe is continued down the abdomen; in females the abdomen is unpatterned. The legs have pale rings in both sexes.

References

Lycosidae
Spiders described in 2003
Spiders of Russia